Kelly Fu Ka Lei (Chinese: 傅嘉莉) (born 6 January 1985) is a Hong Kong-German actress and model. She is currently managed under the Television Broadcasts Limited (TVB).

Career

2003–06: Career beginning
Following her success during the first half of 2003 for her role in her debut TVB drama Hearts of Fencing, Fu played Tsui Kam-mui,  the school's campus belle with a train of boys desperate for a chance to date her. In the latter half of the year, she had a supporting role in the box-office success film, Infernal Affairs II. She played May, the girlfriend of the character Chan Wing-yan, who was portrayed by Shawn Yue.

In 2004 and 2005, Fu had supporting roles in the TVB dramas Sunshine Heartbeat and The Great Adventure. After The Great Adventure, Fu took a break from filming TVB dramas, to instead focus on modeling and her film career.

2007–12: Budding film career
In 2007, Fu played So Tsz-kei in The Haunted School. She starred opposite popular Hong Kong actors Chui Tien-you and Theresa Fu. In 2011, she starred in the film Love Is the Only Answer opposite her TVB colleagues, including Charmaine Sheh, Alex Fong and Him Law. In 2012, Fu played Cindy in the film Fairy Tale Killer, starring opposite Sean Lau and Wang Baoqiang.

2013–present: Gaining recognition
In the popular TVB drama sequel to the hit 2003 drama, Triumph in the Skies II (2013), Fu played Josie, a waitress at the airport's cafe, who was the love interest of Ron Ng’s character. This coupling caused a media frenzy in Hong Kong as netizens speculated that they were dating each other in real life. Alongside fellow TVB actress Rebecca Zhu, Fu was chosen by the media as TVB's "Next-Gen Fadans."

In 2014, Fu had a supporting role in the film, Iceman, starring opposite Donnie Yen.

In the 2015 TVB drama Captain of Destiny, Fu played Ha-sim, an imperial maid who served Ruco Chan’s character. She gained recognition by earning her first Best Supporting Actress nomination at the 2015 TVB Anniversary Awards.

In 2017, Fu starred in three TVB dramas. She took on her first female leading role in the comedy drama  , starring opposite Wayne Lai. Fu had expressed that she felt very nervous when she first filmed with Lai, due to his current status as one of TVB's most well-respected actors, as well as her first time starring as female lead.  In the drama Burning Hands, Fu played Dawn. With this role, she garnered her first nominations for My Favourite TVB Supporting Actress at the 2017 StarHub TVB Awards and Favourite Top 15 TVB Drama Characters at the 2017 TVB Star Awards Malaysia. In the drama Married But Available, Fu played Kay. This role earned her second nomination for Best Supporting Actress at the 2017 TVB Anniversary Awards.

In 2018, Fu starred as the second female lead in the TVB drama , in which she played Chun Chun, an actress. This role garnered her first nominations for Favourite TVB Actress in both Singapore and Malaysia at the 2018 TVB Anniversary Awards.

In the 2020 comedy drama Al Cappuccino, Fu played Mandy, the second younger sister of Vincent Wong’s character. She earned her third nomination for Best Supporting Actress at the 2020 TVB Anniversary Awards.

Personal life 
On 15 July 2018, Fu launched her own brand, Faa, which specializes in hand-made bridal headbands.

Filmography

TV dramas

TVB

Shaw Brothers pictures

Films

Discography

Awards and nominations

References

External links 
 

1985 births
Living people
21st-century Hong Kong actresses
Hong Kong female models
Hong Kong people of German descent
Hong Kong television actresses
TVB actors